Crouzet may refer to:

People with the surname
 Denis Crouzet (born 1953), French historian
 Elisabeth Crouzet-Pavan (born 1953), French historian
 François Crouzet (1922–2010), French historian
 Marguerite Crouzet, French mistress of Georges Boulanger
 Michèle Crouzet, French politician
 Philippe Crouzet (born 1956), French businessman

Places
 Crouzet-Migette, Bourgogne-Franche-Comté, France
 Le Crouzet, Bourgogne-Franche-Comté, France

See also
 Crouzet Automatismes, an automation components company acquired by Schneider Electric

French-language surnames